Mipus is a genus of sea snails, marine gastropod mollusks in the subfamily Coralliophilinae of the family Muricidae, the murex snails or rock snails.

Species
Species within the genus Mipus include:

 Mipus alis Oliverio, 2008
 Mipus arbutum (Woolacott, 1954)
 Mipus basicostatus Kosuge, 1988
 Mipus boucheti Oliverio, 2008
 Mipus brinkae Kosuge, 1992
 Mipus coriolisi Kosuge & Oliverio, 2004
 Mipus crebrilamellosus (G.B. Sowerby III, 1913)
 Mipus eugeniae (Bernardi, 1853)
 Mipus fusiformis (Martens, 1902) 
 Mipus gyratus (Hinds, R.B., 1844)
 Mipus intermedius Kosuge, 1985
 Mipus isosceles (Barnard, 1959)
 Mipus mamimarumai (Kosuge, 1981)
 Mipus matsumotoi Kosuge, 1985
 Mipus miyukiae Kosuge, 1985
 Mipus nodosus (A. Adams, 1854) 
 Mipus rosaceus (E.A. Smith, 1903)
 Mipus sugitanii Kosuge, 1985
 Mipus tomlini (van Regteren Altena, 1950)
 Mipus tonganus Oliverio, 2008
 Mipus tortuosus (Azuma, 1961)
 Mipus vicdani (Kosuge, 1980)
Species brought into synonymy
 Mipus hotei Kosuge, 1985: synonym of Coralliophila hotei (Kosuge, 1985)
 Mipus ovoideus Kosuge, 1985: synonym of Coralliophila ovoidea (Kosuge, 1985)

References

 Spencer, H.; Marshall. B. (2009). All Mollusca except Opisthobranchia. In: Gordon, D. (Ed.) (2009). New Zealand Inventory of Biodiversity. Volume One: Kingdom Animalia. 584 pp

 
Coralliophilinae